Fitri Rosdiana is an Indonesian futsal Pivot.

Honours
Jaya Kencana Angels

AFF Futsal Championship Winner (1) : 2016

References

1993 births
Living people
Indonesian women's futsal players
West Java sportspeople
Sportspeople from Bandung
Indonesian women's footballers
Indonesia women's international footballers
Women's association footballers not categorized by position